"Woman Is the Nigger of the World" is a song by John Lennon and Yoko Ono with Elephant's Memory from their 1972 album Some Time in New York City. Released as the only single from the album in the United States, the song sparked controversy at the time due to the use of the word "nigger" in the title.

Composition
The phrase "woman is the nigger of the world" was coined by Yoko Ono in an interview with Nova magazine in 1969 and quoted on the magazine's cover. Literary analysts note that the phrase owes much to Zora Neale Hurston's novel Their Eyes Were Watching God, in which the protagonist Janie Crawford's grandmother says "De nigger woman is de mule uh de world so fur as Ah can see."  The song describes women's subservience to men and misogyny across all cultures.

In a 1972 interview on The Dick Cavett Show, Lennon said that Irish revolutionary James Connolly was an inspiration for the song. Lennon cited Connolly's statement that "the female worker is the slave of the slave" in explaining the pro-feminist inspiration behind the song.

Release and reception
Due to its use of the racial epithet "nigger" and what was criticized as an inappropriate comparison of sexism to racism against Black Americans, most radio stations in the United States declined to play the record. It was released in the U.S. on 24 April 1972 and peaked at number 57 on the Billboard Hot 100, based primarily on sales, making it Lennon's lowest-charting U.S. single in his lifetime. The song also charted at number 93 on the Cash Box Top 100.

The National Organization for Women (NOW) awarded Lennon and Ono a "Positive Image of Women" citation for the song's "strong pro-feminist statement" in August 1972. Cash Box described the song as the "most powerful epic to come out of the women's movement so far."

In the 1 June 1972 issue of Jet magazine, Apple Records ran an ad for the song with a purported quote from Congressman Ron Dellums, a founding member of the Congressional Black Caucus, claiming that he "agreed" with Lennon and Ono that "women are the niggers of the world." In the 15 June issue, Dellums wrote a letter in response rejecting that he had "agreed" with Lennon and Ono. He clarified that "In a white male-dominated society that sees the role of women as bed-partners, broom pushers, bottle washers, typists and cooks, women are niggers in THIS society."

Classic Rock critic Rob Hughes rated it as Lennon's 9th best political song. By contrast, Showbiz CheatSheet critic Matthew Trzcinski rated the song as the 5th most "horribly racist" song and lambasted Lennon for "repeatedly [using] a slur to make his point [about the oppression of women]. He never should have gone there."

Response to criticism
Through radio and television interviews, Lennon described his use of the term "nigger" as referring to any oppressed person. Apple Records placed an advertisement for the single in the 6 May issue of Billboard magazine featuring a recent statement, unrelated to the song, by prominent black Congressman Ron Dellums to demonstrate the broader use of the term. Lennon also referred to Dellums's statement during an appearance on The Dick Cavett Show, where he and Ono performed the song with the band Elephant's Memory. Because of the controversial title, ABC asked Cavett to apologise to the audience in advance for the song's content; otherwise the performance would not have been shown. Cavett disliked giving the statement, saying in the 2010 documentary LENNONYC:

I had John and Yoko on, and the suits said: "We're gonna write a little insert just before the song for you to say." I said, "You are going to censor my guests after I get them on the show? This is ludicrous." So they wrote this thing, and I went in and taped it in order to retain the song. About 600 protests did come in. None of them about the song! All of them about, quote: "that mealy-mouthed statement you forced Dick to say before the show. Don't you believe we're grown up..." Oh, God. It was wonderful in that sense; it gave me hope for the republic.

Lennon also visited the offices of Ebony and Jet magazines with comedian/activist Dick Gregory and appeared in a cover story, "Ex-Beatle Tells How Black Stars Changed His Life", in the 26 October 1972 issue of Jet.

Reissues
An edited version of the song was included on the 1975 compilation album Shaved Fish. The song was reissued as the B-side to "Stand by Me" on 4 April 1977. It was also included on Working Class Hero: The Definitive Lennon and the Gimme Some Truth box set.

In popular culture
An episode of the television series Better Things, written by Pamela Adlon and Louis C.K., named "Woman is the Something of the Something", features characters discussing the saying "woman is the nigger of the world".

Chart performance

Personnel
Personnel on the single and Some Time in New York City recording are: 
John Lennon – vocals, guitar
Stan Bronstein – tenor saxophone
Gary Van Scyoc – bass
Adam Ippolito – piano, organ
Wayne "Tex" Gabriel – guitar
Richard Frank Jr. – drums, percussion
Jim Keltner – drums

See also 

 White nigger

References

1972 songs
1972 singles
John Lennon songs
Apple Records singles
Songs written by John Lennon
Songs written by Yoko Ono
Song recordings produced by Phil Spector
Song recordings produced by John Lennon
Song recordings produced by Yoko Ono
Song recordings with Wall of Sound arrangements
Songs with feminist themes
Race-related controversies in music
Plastic Ono Band songs
Naming controversies